Peñacerrada in Spanish or Urizaharra in Basque is a town and municipality located in the province of Álava, in the Basque Country, northern Spain. The Church of Nuestra Señora de la Peña de Faido is located in the town.

References

External links
 PEÑACERRADA in the Bernardo Estornés Lasa - Auñamendi Encyclopedia (Euskomedia Fundazioa) 

Municipalities in Álava